The 1962 Furman Paladins football team was an American football team that represented Furman University as a member of the Southern Conference (SoCon) during the 1962 NCAA University Division football season. In their fifth season under head coach Bob King, Furman compiled a 4–6 record, with a mark of 2–2 in conference play, placing fifth in the SoCon.

Schedule

References

Furman
Furman Paladins football seasons
Furman Paladins football